Evgeny Vladimirovich Bazhenov (born May 24, 1991), better known by his internet nickname BadComedian (or Evgen BadComedian), is a Russian YouTube personality and film critic. He features in an eponymous YouTube channel where most of his reviews were uploaded.

Bazhenov makes critical reviews of Russian (and occasionally, American, Indian and Ukrainian) movies. His first review was uploaded on March 28, 2011. Sometimes he uploads positive reviews on a separate channel called EvgenComedian. He used to collaborate with CarambaTV. Evgeny often criticizes comedy films directed by Zhora Kryzhovnikov and released by Enjoy Movies company and action films created by Alexander Nevsky. In 2015—2017 BadTrip web series was released, in which Evgeny Bazhenov travels around different places in the United States related to famous films and TV series. His works are inspired by Nostalgia Critic and The Spoony Experiment reviews. The nickname "BadComedian" is derived from the name of Comedian, a character from the Watchmen comic book and film, while "Bad" implies that Bazhenov himself thinks of his reviews as sarcastic rather than humorious.

Eurosport, RBK and Elle called BadComedian the main film critic of the Russian YouTube.

Biography
Evgeny Bazhenov was born 24 May 1991 in Sterlitamak, Republic of Bashkortostan. At the age of 12 he moved to Dedovsk with his parents. Currently he lives in Nakhabino, an urban-type settlement in Moscow Oblast.

In 2013 Evgeny graduated Russian State University of Trade and Economics, the faculty of commerce and marketing. The theme of his graduation thesis was "Viral videos".

In 2013—2014 and 2017 Bazhenov gave a stand-up performance tour. At the same time he hosted a show about stand-up ProStandUp, which was published at CarambaTV website. BadComedian appeared in cameo roles in the 2016 film Friday and 2015 film Hardcore Henry. He was one of the voice actors for the Russian dub of Wish I Was Here, Tusk (2014), and Sausage Party (2016). Thanks to Bazhenov Wish I Was Here was released in the Russian film distribution service. In gratitude for helping with the release of Wish I Was Here,  the film's director Zach Braff offered Bazhenov the voice role of the film's protagonist in the Russian dub. In 2014, Bazhenov hosted a TV show "Heroes of the Internet" on Russian Peretz TV channel along with Maxim Golopolosov and Ivan Makarevich. He used to work for a year as an editor for Vesti news program on Russia-24 TV channel.

Bazhenov stated that Yuri Bykov, Viktor Shamirov, Roman Karimov and Evgeny Shelyakin are among the russian movie directors he likes.

Reception

Reviews reception 
Bazhenov stated that he has received legal threats by the actor Mikhail Galustyan's connections as well as from the director Maxim Voronkov and the actor and bodybuilder Alexander Nevsky after publishing reviews of their respective films. Alexander Nevsky called Bazhenov "a hater", while Mikhail Galustyan stated that he "offends persons, violates copyright and expresses unconstructive criticism". There are examples of positive reception of reviews by creators and actors of the reviewed films: rapper Basta praised the review of his film called Gasholder, while singer Alexey Vorobyov liked the review of his film Treasures O.K.. Director Yuri Bykov stated that BadComedian's positive review of his movie The Fool had increased its popularity, and expressed graditude to the YouTuber.

Famous Russian translator, film critic Dmitry "Goblin" Puchkov commented on Bazhenov's reviews, calling him "merry and smart" and noting his "surprisingly deep view of life according to his young age". Film critic Alex Exler marked the growth of BadComedian's creativity and praised his moderate use of obscene language.

Company of Heroes 2 controversy 

In 2013, Bazhenov uploaded a review of the game Company of Heroes 2, where he called it "a game created by Nazis", because, as Bazhenov says, the game developers disgraced the history of  World War II, showing the USSR in a negative view, while Nazis, in contrast, were shown in much more sympathetic way. The review caused sales of the game in Russia to stop. The English-language version of his review caused many arguments in the Western gaming community. The incident was highlighted on Polygon, GameSpot, and VideoGamer.com.

To Hack Bloggers 
In 2017 Bazhenov published a devastating review of the film To Hack Bloggers, in which BadComedian heavily criticized the work of Gosfilmofond, a state-controlled foundation which has the declared goal of supporting the Russian cinema. BadComedian stated that To Hack Bloggers was extremely poorly made and called Gosfilmofond's money spending useless. This controversy had an impact in the Russian press. Russian Minister of Culture, Vladimir Medinsky, called the film "a creative failure", while Gosfilmofond's executives announced an investigation about spending of budget money. Bazelevs Company, the studio that created To Hack Bloggers, called BadComedian "an ill-wisher of Russian cinema".

Going Vertical review 

In the night of 31 May 2018, BadComedian uploaded a highly negative review of the feature film Going Vertical, which revolved around the 1972 Olympic Men's Basketball Final. The review turned out to be longer than the actual film. The cause of his discontent was that Going Vertical creators plagiarised another sports drama film, Miracle (2004), on top of that, the film distorted the real history of the basketball match and sportsmen's families were insulted. During the night, after uploading the review, it gathered over one million views and even influenced Going Vertical’s ratings: it lost 30 positions in KinoPoisk′s Top 250 Best Movies, and after that disappeared from the list completely. A week later, Evgeny uploaded another video in which he answered his critics and explained his fans′ actions. The video began with the shoutout of Yuri Kondrashin, the son of the late coach of the Soviet basketball team Vladimir Kondrashin (the Going Vertical′s protagonist), in which he thanked Bazhenov for 
"the rebuff to the slanderers".

Filmography

Live action

Voice acting and dubbing

Video games

References

External links 
 Official website
 BadComedian - about Bondarchuk, Sasha Gray and the 10 best Russian films / Big interview

Russian film critics
Russian YouTubers
Living people
1991 births
People from Sterlitamak
Plekhanov Russian University of Economics alumni
Russian stand-up comedians
Russian television presenters
Russian male voice actors
Commentary YouTubers
Comedy YouTubers
YouTube critics and reviewers
YouTube channels launched in 2011